Henrietta M. King Early College High School is a public high school located in Kingsville, Texas, US. It is part of the Kingsville Independent School District located in west central Kleberg County.

History

H. M. King High School is named after Henrietta King, the wife of Richard King, founder of the King Ranch. The school was previously located on a campus located at 400 West King Avenue. The Mission/Spanish Revival school building constructed on that site in 1909 was placed on the National Register of Historic Places in 1983 and designated a Recorded Texas Historic Landmark in 1981.

Athletics
The Kingsville Brahmas compete in cross country, volleyball, football, basketball, powerlifting, soccer, golf, tennis, track & field, softball, and baseball.

State finalists

Football – 1958 (3A)

Football
The school's football team plays its home games at Javelina Stadium.

Soccer
Both the girls' and boys' soccer teams play their home games at Mopac Field. 
The girls' soccer team is a 3-time district champion, area champion, and regional quarterfinalist.

Arts
The school has a musical program which includes concert bands and a marching band. The H. M. King Mighty Brahma Marching Band reached the state-level UIL Marching Band Competition in San Antonio for the 14th time in the 2014–2015 marching season.

Notable alumni
Laura Canales, Tejano musician and member of the Tejano Music Hall of Fame
Lauro Cavazos, Former Secretary of Education under Ronald Reagan and George H. W. Bush
Richard E. Cavazos, First Mexican-American 4-star general
Reality Winner, federal contractor who pled guilty to illegally leaking top-secret information

See also

National Register of Historic Places listings in Kleberg County, Texas
Recorded Texas Historic Landmarks in Kleberg County

References

External links

Kingsville ISD

Kingsville, Texas
National Register of Historic Places in Kleberg County, Texas
Public high schools in Texas
School buildings on the National Register of Historic Places in Texas
Schools in Kleberg County, Texas